ActionKid (alter ego of Kenneth Chin) is a Chinese American YouTuber and  livestreamer.

YouTube 
Chin has had a YouTube account since September 2010, and the channel was launched on January 10, 2016.

Personal life
Chin enjoys walking and has always been "obsessed with subways" since he was younger. Chin in his "ActionKid" persona shoots video frequently and his routes are influenced by "[c]urrent events, re-openings, time of day, requests from viewers, and [Chin's] availability." Chin also holds a NYC tour guide license as of 2019.

References

1987 births
Living people
People from New York City
Travel broadcasters
YouTube channels launched in 2010